This article lists the results for the sport of Squash in 2018.

2017–18 PSA World Series
 October 7 – 14: 2017 United States Open in  Philadelphia
 Men:  Ali Farag defeated  Mohamed El Shorbagy, 12–10, 11–9, 10–8.
 Women:  Nour El Tayeb defeated  Raneem El Weleily, 8–11, 11–4, 5–11, 11–7, 11–7.
 October 29 – November 3: 2017 Qatar Classic in  Doha
  Mohamed El Shorbagy defeated  Tarek Momen, 11–8, 10–12, 11–7, 11–7.
 November 14 – 19: 2017 Hong Kong Open in 
 Men:  Mohamed El Shorbagy defeated  Ali Farag, 11–6, 5–11, 11–4, 7–11, 11–3.
 Women:  Nour El Sherbini defeated  Raneem El Weleily, 11–5, 11–8, 11–5.
 January 7 – 12: Saudi PSA Women's Masters in  Riyadh
 Women:  Nour El Sherbini defeated  Raneem El Weleily, 11–7, 11–8, 13–11.
 January 18 – 25: 2018 Tournament of Champions in  New York City
 Men:  Simon Rösner defeated  Tarek Momen, 11–8, 11–9, 6–11, 11–5.
 Women:  Nour El Sherbini defeated  Nour El Tayeb, 2–11, 11–6, 4–11, 11–7, 11–7.
 February 22 – 28: 2018 Windy City Open in  Chicago
 Men:  Mohamed El Shorbagy defeated  Marwan El Shorbagy, 11–8, 11–8, 11–6.
 Women:  Nour El Tayeb defeated  Joelle King, 11–8, 10–12, 11–13, 11–9, 12–10.
 April 20 – 27: El Gouna International in  El Gouna
 Men:  Marwan El Shorbagy defeated  Ali Farag, 11–8, 11–5, 11–4.
 Women:  Raneem El Weleily defeated  Nour El Sherbini, 5–11, 11–8, 11–3, 14–12.
 May 15–20: British Open Squash Championships in  Kingston upon Hull
 Men:  Miguel Ángel Rodríguez defeated  Mohamed El Shorbagy, 11-7, 6-11, 8-11, 11-2, 11-9
 Women:  Nour El Sherbini defeated  Raneem El Weleily, 11–6, 11–9, 14–12.
 June 5–9: World Series Squash Finals in  Dubai
 Men:  Mohamed El Shorbagy defeated   Ali Farag, 9-11, 11-3, 11-9, 11-8
 Women:  Nour El Sherbini defeated  Raneem El Weleily, 11-5, 9-11, 11-8, 11-5

World and Continental Championships
 March 21 – 25: 2018 Asian Squash Team Championships in  Cheongju
 Team winners:  (m) /  Hong Kong (f)
 March 24 – April 1: 2018 European U19 Individual & Team Championships in  Bielsko-Biała
 U19 winners:  Victor Crouin (m) /  Lucy Turmel (f)
 Team winners: 
 April 25 – 28: 2018 European Team Championships Division 3 in  Riga
 Team winners:  (m) /  Ukraine (f)
 May 2 – 5: European Team Championship Divisions 1 & 2 in  Wrocław
 Division 1:  (m) /  England (f)
 Division 2:  (m) /  Spain (f)
 May 9 – 13: Under 15/17 Team European Championships in  Malmö
 U15 winners: , 2nd: , 3rd: 
 U17 winners: , 2nd: , 3rd: 
 August 29 – September 1: European Individual Closed Championships in  Wrocław
 Men:  Borja Golán defeated  George Parker, 8–11, 11–4, 10–12, 13–11, 11–6
 Women:  Millie Tomlinson defeated  Coline Aumard, 11–9, 12–10, 4–11, 11–7
 September 6 – 12: 2018 World University Squash Championship in  Birmingham
 Men:  Joshua Masters defeated  Yip Tsz Fung, 8–11 11–8, 11-2, 11–5.
 Women:  Lily Rhian Taylor defeated  Alexa Pienaar, 11–7, 11–8, 11–6.
 September 19 – 22: European Club Championships in  Eindhoven
 Men:  Paderborner SC defeated  Edgbaston Priory Club, 3–2.  Viktoria Brno Sportprofit took third place.
 Women:  Edgbaston Priory Club defeated  SC Fricktal, 2–0.  Edinburgh Sports Club took third place.

References

External links
 World Squash: official website of the World Squash Federation

 
Squash by year
2018 sport-related lists